Fourway, also known as Burkes Garden Siding, is a former unincorporated community in Tazewell County, Virginia, that has been annexed by the town of Tazewell. It includes the intersection of U.S. Route 19/460 Business with State Route 61.

References

Unincorporated communities in Tazewell County, Virginia
Unincorporated communities in Virginia